The Ōpūrehu River is a river of the Northland Region of New Zealand's North Island. It flows south from the eastern end of the Maungataniwha Range to reach the Mangamuka River at the small settlement of Mangamuka.

See also
List of rivers of New Zealand

References

Rivers of the Northland Region
Rivers of New Zealand